William Marriott (6 January 1850 – 28 August 1887) was an English first-class cricketer active 1880–81 who played for Nottinghamshire. He was born in Hucknall-under-Huthwaite; died in Huyton.

References

1850 births
1887 deaths
English cricketers
Nottinghamshire cricketers